Stefan de Vrij (born 5 February 1992) is a Dutch professional footballer who plays as a centre back for  club Inter Milan and the Netherlands national team.

He began his career at his local club VV Spirit, and debuted as a professional for Feyenoord aged 17. He spent five seasons at the Eredivisie club, serving briefly as captain, before joining Lazio in July 2014.

A full international since 2012, De Vrij has earned over 50 caps for the Netherlands. He was part of the Dutch team that finished third at the 2014 FIFA World Cup, and was selected for the Castrol Performance Index Team of the Tournament. He also played at UEFA Euro 2020.

Early life
De Vrij grew up in Ouderkerk aan den IJssel. He is the youngest son of Jan de Vrij, who played for local club VV Spirit, where Stefan de Vrij started his career. His older brothers Niels and Eric played football in their youth and continued to different career paths.

Club career

Feyenoord

De Vrij played for local Ouderkerk aan den IJssel club VV Spirit for five seasons. At the age of 10, he attended a Feyenoord talent day. After various training sessions and a friendly match against ARC, De Vrij was officially asked to join Feyenoord's youth division. At VV Spirit, De Vrij often played as a central midfielder, but at Feyenoord he got turned into a defender. The youngster developed himself rapidly. After playing for Feyenoord U15, De Vrij was one of the players to skip the U16 team to play in the U17 immediately.

On 17 July 2009, De Vrij signed his first professional contract with Feyenoord until summer 2012. De Vrij made his official debut for Feyenoord's first team on 24 September 2009, when he replaced Kelvin Leerdam in the 58th minute in the KNVB Cup away match against Harkemase Boys (0–5). On 6 December 2009, De Vrij made his Eredivisie debut in the home match against FC Groningen (3–1), when he replaced Denny Landzaat in the 89th minute. Aged 18 by its end, his first professional season saw him make 21 appearances, 17 of which were in the league.

During the 2012–13 season, De Vrij replaced Ron Vlaar as team captain. However, after a poor run of form in the following campaign, De Vrij was stripped of his armband as it was given first to star striker Graziano Pellè and then to vice-captain Jordy Clasie after the former struggled with disciplinary issues.

Lazio
On 30 July 2014, De Vrij joined Serie A club Lazio for an undisclosed fee. He said "Lazio really proved that they wanted me and I am very happy I have made this move. I hope to become a more complete defender in Italy." De Vrij had been widely expected to follow his international manager Louis van Gaal to Manchester United.

He made his debut on 24 August in the third round of the Coppa Italia, and scored the third goal of a 7–0 home win over third-tier Bassano Virtus. A week later, he played his first Serie A match as Lazio began the season with a 3–1 defeat at A.C. Milan. On 21 September, he was sent off in the 85th minute of a game away to Genoa which Lazio had been dominating, and two minutes later Mauricio Pinilla scored the only goal to give Genoa victory. De Vrij featured in the 2015 Coppa Italia Final on 20 May against Juventus, being substituted for Keita at half time in extra time in an eventual 2–1 defeat.

His second season began with the 2015 Supercoppa Italiana, playing the full 90 minutes of a 2–0 loss to Juventus in Shanghai. In September, he picked up a knee injury on international duty but was passed fit to play a further match for the Netherlands, infuriating Lazio's medical staff. He did not make a sufficient recovery, and was subjected to an operation the following month. In November, it was confirmed that he would miss the next six months due to the injury.

He scored his first goal for the club in Serie A on 11 September 2016 in a 1–1 away draw to Chievo.

In March 2018, Lazio's sporting director Igli Tare announced that De Vrij would be leaving the club on a free transfer in the summer.

Inter Milan
Following months of speculation, on 28 May 2018, De Vrij announced that he was going to join Inter Milan starting on 1 July. On 11 July, he was officially presented as an Inter player, signing a contract until June 2023. De Vrij received squad number 6, and made his competitive debut on 19 August in the opening championship week against Sassuolo.

He scored his first goal for Nerazzurri one week later, putting his side two goals up against Torino at home, in an eventual 2–2 draw. In September 2018, De Vrij played his 100th match in Serie A in the 2–1 home win over Fiorentina. He also made his first UEFA Champions League appearance in season opener against Tottenham Hotspur, assisting Matías Vecino's injury-time winner for a 2–1 home win. De Vrij eventually played 5 out of 6 matches in the competition's group stage, which saw en early elimination of Inter, instead continuing their European adventure in knockout phase of UEFA Europa League.

Later on 14 March 2019, in the second leg of Europa League round of 16, De Vrij's wrong ball control resulted fatal for Inter who conceded inside 5 minutes, and eventually lost the game to Eintracht Frankfurt 1–0 at San Siro, crashing out of competition 1–0 on aggregate. Three days later, De Vrij scored in the Derby della Madonnina match against rivals Milan, helping his team to win 3–2, taking back the third place in championship, and completing the first league double over them since 2011–12 season.

On 9 November 2019, in the 2019–20 season, De Vrij made his 50th appearance in all competitions for Inter in a 2–1 league win over Verona at San Siro.

International career

Youth teams
De Vrij's strong development at Feyenoord did not pass by unnoticed, as he quickly received his first invitation for a national youth team. On 21 November 2007, the Netherlands U16 won the friendly match against Ukraine U16 (1–0), with De Vrij's first appearance in the starting line-up.

De Vrij was active on the 2009 UEFA European Under-17 Football Championship in Germany. The Dutch team, aided by a strong contingent of seven Feyenoord players in the squad, finished second after losing the final to Germany in extra-time (2–1). De Vrij was paired up with Dico Koppers in central defence and participated in every match the Oranje played without getting substituted, making a notable contribution. With a second place on the European Championship, the Netherlands U17 qualified for the 2009 FIFA U-17 World Cup in Nigeria.

Senior team
On 7 May 2012, De Vrij was named in the provisional list of 36 players for the UEFA Euro 2012 tournament, one of nine uncapped players to be chosen by Netherlands manager Bert van Marwijk as part of the preliminary squad. He did not make the final cut. On 15 August 2012, De Vrij made his debut under new manager Louis van Gaal in the 4–2 loss against Belgium in a friendly match.

He was one of four Feyenoord defenders named in Louis van Gaal's squad for the 2014 FIFA World Cup. In the Netherlands' first game of the tournament, against Spain on 13 June, the referee gave a questionable penalty kick after 26 minutes after Diego Costa stood on De Vrij's foot and fell. Xabi Alonso converted this penalty to put Spain 1–0 up. The Dutch fought back, and De Vrij scored their third goal, the first of his international career, as they eventually won 5–1. De Vrij played in all of the Netherlands' matches as they eventually finished in third place. He and Arjen Robben were the two Dutch players selected to the Team of the Tournament.

In the Netherlands' first game of UEFA Euro 2016 qualification away to the Czech Republic on 9 September 2014, De Vrij equalised with a header from Daley Blind's cross but the Dutch lost 2–1. He headed the team into the lead after 13 minutes in an eventual 2–0 win over Spain in a friendly at the Amsterdam ArenA on 31 March 2015, also wearing the captain's armband after Wesley Sneijder's substitution.

Career statistics

Club

International

Scores and results list Netherlands' goal tally first, score column indicates score after each De Vrij goal.

Honours
Lazio
 Supercoppa Italiana: 2017
 Coppa Italia runner-up: 2014–15, 2016–17

Inter Milan
 Serie A: 2020–21
 Coppa Italia: 2021–22
 Supercoppa Italiana: 2021, 2022
 UEFA Europa League runner-up: 2019–20

Netherlands U17
 UEFA European Under-17 Championship runner-up: 2009

Netherlands
 FIFA World Cup third place: 2014

Individual
FIFA World Cup All-Star Team: 2014
Serie A Best Defender: 2019–20
UEFA Europa League Squad of the Season: 2019–20
Serie A Team of the Year: 2019–20, 2020–21

References

External links

 Profile at the Inter Milan website
 Stefan de Vrij at Voetbal International 
 
 
 
 
 
 

1992 births
Living people
People from Ouderkerk
Footballers from South Holland
Dutch footballers
Association football defenders
Feyenoord players
S.S. Lazio players
Inter Milan players
Eredivisie players
Serie A players
Netherlands youth international footballers
Netherlands under-21 international footballers
Netherlands international footballers
2014 FIFA World Cup players
UEFA Euro 2020 players
2022 FIFA World Cup players
Dutch expatriate footballers
Expatriate footballers in Italy
Dutch expatriate sportspeople in Italy